Acraea (Ancient Greek:  means 'of the heights' from akraios) was a name that had several uses in Greek and Roman mythology.

Acraea, the naiad daughter of the river-god Asterion near Mycenae, who together with her sisters Euboea and Prosymna acted as nurses to Hera. A hill Acraea opposite the temple of Hera near Mycenae derived its name from her.
Acraea and Acraeus are also epithets given to various goddesses and gods whose temples were situated upon hills, such as Zeus, Hera, Aphrodite, Athena, Artemis, and others.

Notes

References 

 Apollodorus, The Library with an English Translation by Sir James George Frazer, F.B.A., F.R.S. in 2 Volumes, Cambridge, MA, Harvard University Press; London, William Heinemann Ltd. 1921. ISBN 0-674-99135-4. Online version at the Perseus Digital Library. Greek text available from the same website.
Bell, Robert E., Women of Classical Mythology: A Biographical Dictionary. ABC-Clio. 1991. .
Pausanias, Description of Greece with an English Translation by W.H.S. Jones, Litt.D., and H.A. Ormerod, M.A., in 4 Volumes. Cambridge, MA, Harvard University Press; London, William Heinemann Ltd. 1918. . Online version at the Perseus Digital Library
Pausanias, Graeciae Descriptio. 3 vols. Leipzig, Teubner. 1903.  Greek text available at the Perseus Digital Library.

Naiads
Nymphs
Children of Potamoi
Epithets of Zeus
Epithets of Hera
Epithets of Aphrodite
Epithets of Athena
Epithets of Artemis
Argive characters in Greek mythology
Mythology of Argolis

de:Akraia
no:Acraea
sv:Akraia